Intelsat 20 is a geostationary communications satellite which is operated by Intelsat. It was constructed by Space Systems/Loral, and is based on the LS-1300 satellite bus. It was launched on 2 August 2012, and replaces the Intelsat 7 and Intelsat 10 spacecraft at 68.5° East longitude. It is fully operational since September 2012.

Intelsat 20 is the 47th satellite that Space Systems/Loral will provide to Intelsat, the leading provider of Fixed-Satellite Services (FSS) worldwide.

Intelsat 20 carries 24 C-band, 54 Ku-band and 1 Ka-band transponders. The C-band covers the Asia-Pacific region, while the Ku-band transponders is used for Direct to Home broadcasting to Asia, Africa, and the Middle East. The Ka-band payload provides coverage to the Middle East and Central Asia.

See also 

 Intelsat
 List of Intelsat satellites
 Intelsat 19

References

External links 
 Intelsat Official provider's site
 Intelsat 20 satellite setting and directions
 Satbeams:  Intelsat 20 (IS-20)

Intelsat satellites
Communications satellites in geostationary orbit
Spacecraft launched in 2012